The Orange Warsaw Open (former Orange Prokom Open) was an annual men's tennis tournament played in Poland as part of the ATP Tour. The tournament was played on clay courts. The men's tournament began in 2001, when the San Marino Open moved to Sopot. Until 2007, the tournament was held in Sopot, before moving to Warsaw for 2008.

There was also a women's tournament on the same site. It was first organized in 1992 as a lower level competition. In 1998, the tournament became a Tier IV tournament on the WTA Tour. The next year, it moved up to Tier III. The women's tournament folded in 2004.

Past finals

Men's singles

Women's singles

Men's doubles

Women's doubles

See also
List of tennis tournaments
Warsaw Open
WTA Poland Open
Katowice Open

External links
 Official website

 
ATP Tour
WTA Tour
Tennis tournaments in Poland
Clay court tennis tournaments
Recurring sporting events established in 1992
Defunct tennis tournaments in Europe
Defunct sports competitions in Poland